Ando is a rural hamlet with a very small population in the Snowy Monaro Regional Council in southern New South Wales, Australia. The surrounding area is predominantly agricultural land holdings.

Ando was first settled around 1862 by Ghikas Boulgaris (locally known as Jigger Bulgary), a Greek convict who had been transported to New South Wales after being captured attempting to rob a British merchant ship in the Mediterranean Sea. Boulgaris, the first Greek migrant in Australia, took up land on the Bibbenluke estate and named it Ando.

A school opened in the village in 1913, but closed in 2011 when enrollments had dropped to just 6 students. The village also maintains a rural fire service and a community hall. A railway station at Jincumbilly, a few kilometers west served Ando and the surrounding pastoral areas between 1921 and 1975. There was a post office there from 1915 until 1981.

References

External links

Towns in New South Wales
Snowy Monaro Regional Council